= EU Strategy for the Adriatic and Ionian Region =

On September 29, 2014, the European Council issued conclusions creating the European Union Strategy for the Adriatic and Ionian Region (EUSAIR). In the conclusions, the European Council stressed that "EUSAIR is of interest to all EU Member States and has the capacity to contribute to further integration of the internal market, to the stability of the area, to foster cooperation between EU and non-EU countries." The Adriatic and Ionian Seas region is home to more than 70 million people.

EUSAIR is one of four EU macro-regional strategies: the Baltic Sea Region (2009), the Danube Region (2011), and the Alpine Region (2016). EUSAIR's goal is to promote economic, social prosperity, and growth in the Adriatic-Ionian Seas region by improving its attractiveness, competitiveness and connectivity.

EUSAIR participating countries are Albania, Bosnia and Herzegovina, Croatia, Greece, Italy, Montenegro, North Macedonia, Serbia, and Slovenia. With four of the members being EU members and the other non-EU members, the Strategy hopes to further support the EU integration process of the Western Balkans.

The work of the EUSAIR is coordinated by a Governing Board. Each participating country rotates in chairing the EUSAIR with the support of the European Commission. Standing members of the Governor Board consist of two formally appointed representatives from each country ("one senior official from the Ministry of Foreign Affairs and one senior official from the national administration responsible for coordinating EU funds in the country"), pillar coordinators (Blue Growth, Connecting the Region, Environmental Quality, and Sustainable Tourism), European Commission representatives, a representative from the European Parliament, among other European officials.

The EUSAIR holds an Annual Forum, hosting a wide range of stakeholders of the nine participating countries meeting to discuss "the progress of the EUSAIR Strategy and define the way ahead."
